Oil crisis or oil shock may refer to:

 Abadan Crisis ("Iran Oil Crisis") of 1951–1954 - nationalization, coup, and de-nationalisation in Iran
 1970s energy crisis
 1973 oil crisis, the first worldwide oil crisis, in which prices increased 400%
 1979 oil crisis, in which prices increased 100%
 1990 oil price shock (the "mini oil-shock"), in which prices increased for nine months
 2000s energy crisis
 2020 Russia–Saudi Arabia oil price war, in which prices declined more than 50%
 2022 Russia–European Union gas dispute, in which EU member states sought to rapidly exclude natural gas imports from Russia following Russia's invasion of Ukraine
 Peak oil, a hypothetical time in the future when oil production enters permanent decline

See also 
 Energy crisis